Sheldon Thomas (born December 8, 1972) is a former Trinidadian soccer player who played for LA Galaxy.

He also played for South China Athletic Club and Orange County Waves, and was capped three times for Trinidad & Tobago.

Club career

Early career 
Thomas attended El Camino College and Saint Benedict's College before studying at California State University in 1996. He was named All American and Athlete of the Year in 1996 and 1997 for the Mountain Pacific Division.

South China Athletic Club 
After graduating, Thomas joined Hong Kong side South China Athletic Club. He won honors of MVP with a double championship in the Vice Roy Cup and the Hong Kong FA Cup. During his time in Asia, he also represented the club in the Asian Club Championships.

Orange County Waves 
Thomas moved back to the United States in 1999 and joined Orange County Waves.

LA Galaxy 
In 2000, Thomas was called up to represent LA Galaxy, the parent club of the Orange County Waves, in the World Club Championships. Sheldon made a single appearance for the club with a nine-minute cameo from the bench.

International career 
Thomas was called up to the Trinidad & Tobago national team in 1998. He made his international debut in a 2–1 win over Martinique in the Caribbean Cup, and also featured in wins against Dominica and Haiti.

References 

1972 births
Living people
Association football midfielders
Major League Soccer players
LA Galaxy players
Trinidad and Tobago footballers
Trinidad and Tobago international footballers
Trinidad and Tobago expatriate footballers
Expatriate soccer players in the United States
Expatriate footballers in Hong Kong
South China AA players